Iris innominata, the Del Norte County iris, is a species of iris native to southern Oregon, and California along the north coast and Klamath Ranges in Del Norte County, California.

The leaves are dense and evergreen, up to 20 cm. The flower is typically deep golden yellow with darker veins, although colors may vary. The flower stems are about 12 cm and usually bear 1–2 flowers in spring.

It is on the California Native Plant Society Inventory of Rare and Endangered Plants of California List 4, Limited distribution (Watch List).

Cultivation
Iris innominata, used in gardens, does best in locations with cool, wet winters and warm, dry summers, in neutral or slightly acidic soil, with good drainage, and sun or partial shade. It is often used for hybridizing with other Iris species. Many plants sold under this name in nurseries are hybrids.

References

External links

 Treatment from the Jepson Manual
  California Native Plant Society Inventory of Rare and Endangered Plants

 Harlow, Nora, Jakob, Kristin, and Raiche, Roger (2003) Wild Lilies, Irises, and Grasses. University of California Press. .

innominata
Flora of California
Flora of the Klamath Mountains
Flora of Oregon
Garden plants of North America
Plants described in 1930
Flora without expected TNC conservation status